Harpurhey is an inner-city suburb of Manchester in North West England, three miles north east of the city centre. Historically in Lancashire, the population at the 2011 census was 17,652.

Areas of Harpurhey include Kingsbridge Estate, Barnes Green, Shiredale Estate and Baywood Estate.

History
Harpurhey is recorded in 1320 as "Harpourhey", meaning "hedged enclosure by a man called Harpour", who owned the area in the 14th century.

This small township, at one time called Harpurhey with Gotherswick, lies on both sides of the road from Manchester to Middleton, extending westward to the Irk. In 1830 it was described as abounding in pleasant views. and by early 2007, just a mere 177 years later it was described as the worst place in England.  It has long been a suburb of Manchester.

Governance
Harpurhey was included in the Parliamentary borough of Manchester from its creation but was not taken into the municipal borough until 1885. It ceased to be a township in 1896, becoming part of the new township of North Manchester. Harpurhey is one of the most economically deprived areas within the Greater Manchester area.

Harpurhey is within the Blackley and Broughton constituency, which has been represented in the House of Commons by Labour MP Graham Stringer who was first elected to the old Manchester Blackley constituency in 1997. Before his election to Parliament, he was a councillor for Harpurhey from 1982, and leader of Manchester City Council from 1984.

Councillors

The ward is represented on Manchester City Council by three Labour Party councillors: Pat Karney (Lab), Joanne Green (Lab) and Sandra Collins (Lab).

 indicates seat up for re-election.

Geography
Harpurhey is 2.3 miles (3.7 km) north east of Manchester city centre. To the north, Harpurhey is bordered by Blackley, to the west by Crumpsall, to the east by Moston and to the south by Collyhurst and Monsall.

Landmarks
The Edwardian swimming baths on Rochdale Road was built between 1909-10 by Henry Price, Manchester's first City Architect. Listed grade II in 1994, the baths closed to the public in 2001 after serious defects were discovered. The women's pool hall and laundry have now been replaced by the MANCAT sixth form college and community library.

The World Famous Embassy Club on Rochdale Road was bought by Bernard Manning in 1959, before which it had been Harpurhey Temperance Billiard Hall.

Queen's Park was one of Britains first municipal parks in 1846; designed and laid out by Joshua Major in 1845, the park was originally arranged around Hendham Hall, home of the Houghton family, which was demolished in 1884. The park incorporated a labyrinth, sheds and greenhouses, but by 1930 these had been removed. Today the park has a children's play area, rose gardens and hosts a variety of community events.

Transport
Harpurhey is served by a number of bus services on the main Rochdale Road (A664) corridor, as well as non-radial services to and from Salford Shopping Precinct  and Oldham. Services include First Greater Manchester 17, 18, 52, 53, 64, 162 and 163, and Stagecoach Manchester 112 and 118.

Manchester Metrolink light rail tram system has two stations close to Harpurhey, at Monsall and Central Park (North Manchester Business Park), which also borders Newton Heath.

Religion

There are a number churches in the district, including the Church of England Christ Church, built in 1838. St Stephen's was founded in 1899 and closed in 1985, where is merged with Harpurhey United Church which became Harpurhey Community Church.

Other churches include Park View Christ the Vine and Deeper Life.

Harpurhey is in the Roman Catholic Diocese of Salford, and the Church of England Diocese of Manchester.

Manchester General Cemetery in Harpurhey was founded in 1837 and is still open to existing grave-owners. Although now a municipal cemetery, it is believed that Harpurhey cemetery was originally a private undertaking taken over by the municipal authority in 1868. Harpurhey Cemetery became the final resting place of Hannah Beswick (in 1868), the Manchester Mummy. and Benjamin Brierley (1825–1896).

Education
Two schools in the area cater for children aged between 3-11: Manchester Communication Primary Academy and Oasis Academy Harper Mount,

Manchester Communication Academy is at the junction of Queens Road and Rochdale Road in Harpurhey. It is run in conjunction with BT, Manchester City Council and The Manchester College catering for 11-18-year-olds.

Sport
North City Family and Fitness Centre is a centre combining leisure facilities with a Sure Start Centre, just off Rochdale Road next to the North City Shopping Centre and Market. The centre includes a 25-metre, five lane swimming pool with a movable pool floor designed to help young, elderly and disabled people. There is a health suite which includes spa pool, sauna and steam rooms, and a gymnasium. The centre also offers an exercise studio with a programme of fitness classes and martial arts.

Public services

Library services provided by Policing in Harpurhey is provided by Greater Manchester Police with a part-time station on Moston Lane under the command of North Manchester (A) Division. The opening times are 10 a.m.–6 p.m. Monday to Saturday.

Notable people

Anthony Burgess (1917-1993) was a novelist, critic, composer, librettist, poet, playwright, screenwriter, essayist, travel writer, broadcaster, translator, linguist and educationalist.
Rachel Fairburn (born 1983), stand up comedian
Freddie Garrity (1936–2006), singer in 1960s pop group Freddie and the Dreamers
Shotty Horroh (born 1986), Also known as Adam Rooney is a retired battle rapper now a singer and songwriter
Pat McDonagh (1934-2014), was a British fashion designer who became an important figure in Canadian fashion.
Smug Roberts (born 1960), real name Andy Robert Wilkinson, is an English stand up comedian and actor
Brandon Williams (born 2000), professional footballer for Manchester United.

See also

Listed buildings in Manchester-M9

References
Notes

Bibliography

Areas of Manchester
Manchester City Council Wards